Partido Estadista Puertorriqueño (English: Puerto Rican Statehood Party) [1948 - 1952] was a political party in Puerto Rico that existed from 1948 to 1952.  The party resulted when Partido Unión Republicana Progresista ceased to exist in 1948, renaming itself as "Partido Estadista Puertorriqueño." Its president was Celestino Iriarte. Partido Estadista Puertorriqueño dissolved in 1952 when, once again, it changed names "to return to its roots" and renamed itself as Partido Estadista Republicano, the party founded by Jose Celso Barbosa in 1899.

See also

Socialist Party (Puerto Rico)
Partido Republicano Puro
Partido Unión Republicana

References

Further reading 
 José Trías Monge, Puerto Rico: The Trials of the Oldest Colony in the World (Yale University Press, 1997)

External links
 Elecciones en Puerto Rico.
 Coaliciones, alianzas, y uniones entre las colectividades (1896-1945) by CECANGPR
 Entre 1920 y 1924 on Pomarrosas

Defunct political parties in Puerto Rico
Political parties established in 1948
1952 disestablishments
Statehood movement in Puerto Rico
Political parties in Puerto Rico